Franco Forini (born 22 September 1958) is a former racing driver from Switzerland. He competed in the Italian Formula Three Championship between 1981 and 1985, winning the title in his final year in a Dallara-Volkswagen with future Formula One team Forti Corse, and finishing as runner up in the Monaco Grand Prix Formula 3 support race in the same year. He moved up to Formula 3000 in 1986 with little success. He participated in three Formula One Grands Prix, debuting on 6 September 1987.  He scored no championship points.

After his brief stint in Formula One, he returned to Formula 3 in 1988 and 1989 without any further success. He later ran a transportation and shipment company in Minusio.

Complete Formula One results
(key)

References

External links
Profile at F1 Rejects

1958 births
Living people
Swiss racing drivers
Swiss Formula One drivers
Osella Formula One drivers
Italian Formula Three Championship drivers
International Formula 3000 drivers
Sportspeople from Ticino

Scuderia Coloni drivers